Kinza Godfrey Clodumar (8 February 1945 – 29 November 2021) was a Nauruan politician who served as President of Nauru from 1997 to 1998.

Background
Clodumar was born in Boe. He was a member of the indigenous population of Nauru, and he was concerned with environmental issues. He was a Member of Parliament for many years.

Clodumar was the only Nauruan politician to have been elected to parliament in two different constituencies. He served his first two terms for the Aiwo Constituency when ousting Itubwa Amram in the 1971 elections; after being re-elected thrice Clodumar resigned his post in early 1979, but was re-elected in the 1983 elections. In 1992, he did not stand for the seat and moved to the neighbouring Boe Constituency, where he was re-elected in 1995 to serve a third term in parliament.

Clodumar served as Minister Assisting the President of Nauru in the cabinets of Bernard Dowiyogo and Kennan Adeang in 1976-1978 and from September 1986 to October 1986. He was the Speaker of the Parliament of Nauru from a short term in December 1986.

He was Minister of Finance several times: January 1977 to January 1978, September 1986 to October 1986, December 1986 to August 1989, December 1989 to September 1993 and in November 1996.

Clodumar gave and withdrew support from several other Nauruan politicians, including Bernard Dowiyogo, René Harris and Ludwig Scotty. For presidents, withdrawal of support by Clodumar often meant that a president would lose a no confidence vote.

Presidency
Clodumar was President of Nauru from 12 February 1997 until 18 June 1998, when he was deposed in a no confidence vote. He held the office of Minister of Finance of Nauru during his term.

Later life
He later served again as Minister of Finance several times: April 1999 to June 1999, May 2000 to August 2000, March 2004 to May 2004 and June 2004 to August 2004. In 2003, Clodumar himself tried to regain the presidency of Nauru twice but narrowly lost the parliamentary vote both times. He lost his seat in Parliament in the October 2004 election.

Clodumar was also noted for having founded and led the Centre Party.

He died on 29 November 2021, at the age of 76, and received a state funeral the following day.

See also

 Itubwa Amram#Political role
 David Agir#Political role

References

External links
 Article re. support of Clodumar for Scotty Administration: 'Nauru's new government begins work today', Radio New Zealand International, 22 June 2004 http://www.rnzi.com/pages/news.php?op=read&id=10635

1945 births
2021 deaths
Members of the Parliament of Nauru
Speakers of the Parliament of Nauru
Presidents of Nauru
Finance Ministers of Nauru
People from Aiwo District
People from Boe District
Centre Party (Nauru) politicians
Ministers Assisting the President of Nauru
20th-century Nauruan politicians
21st-century Nauruan politicians